A safe house (also spelled safehouse) is, in a generic sense, a secret place for sanctuary or suitable to hide people from the law, hostile actors or actions, or from retribution, threats or perceived danger.  It may also be a metaphor.

Historical usage
It may also refer to:

 in the jargon of law enforcement and intelligence agencies, a secure location, suitable for hiding witnesses, agents or other persons perceived as being in danger
 a place where people may go to avoid prosecution of their activities by authorities. Osama bin Laden's compound in Abbottabad has been described as a "safe house".
 a place where spying undercover hitmen may conduct clandestine observations or meet other operatives surreptitiously
 a location where a trusted adult or family or charity organization provides a haven for victims of domestic abuse (see also: men and/or women's shelter or refuge)
 a home of a trusted person, family or organization where victims of war and/or persecution may take refuge, receive protection and/or live in secret
 a house whose sole purpose is to conduct illegal ventures. Criminals use these to conduct different aspects of their business, such as produce, sell, or store product.
 Right of asylum
 sanctuary in medieval law
 sanctuary in modern times
 Church asylum

Typically, the significance of safe houses is kept secret from all but a limited number of people, for the safety of those hidden within them.

Many religious institutions will allow one to obtain sanctuary within one's place of worship, and some governments respect and do not violate such sanctuary.

Safe houses were an integral part of the Underground Railroad, the network of safe house locations that were used to assist slaves in escaping to the primarily northern free states in the 19th century United States. Some houses were marked with a statue of an African-American man holding a lantern, called "the Lantern Holder".

Safe houses also provided a refuge for victims of Nazi persecution and for escaping prisoners of war. Victims, such as Anne Frank and her family, were harbored clandestinely for extended periods of time. Other Jewish victims that were hidden from the Germans include Philip Slier and his extended family and friends.

See also
Hideout (disambiguation)
Refuge
Retreat (survivalism)
Right of asylum
Safe harbor (disambiguation)
Safe haven (disambiguation)
Sanctuary cities
Sanctuary movement
Jose Figueroa deportation case

References

Sources
 Slier, Philip "Flip" & Slier, Deborah. Hidden Letters: The Hidden Letters of Flip Slier. Star Bright Books, 2008. .

Law enforcement terminology
 
Types of secret places